The Ferrari 166 Inter was Ferrari's first true grand tourer. An evolution of the 125 S and 166 S racing cars, it was a sports car for the street with coachbuilt bodies. The Inter name commemorated the victories claimed in 166 S models by Scuderia Inter. 38 166 Inters were built from 1948 through 1950. Note that both the 166 S and 166 F2 were also called "166 Inter" in the days that they were actively raced by the Scuderia of the same name.

The 166 Inter shared its Aurelio Lampredi-designed tube frame, double wishbone/live axle suspension, and  wheelbase with the 125 S and 166 S. It was replaced by the 2.3 L 195 Inter in 1950.

The first Ferrari GT car debuted at the Paris Motor Show on October 6, 1949. It was an elegant coupé designed by Carrozzeria Touring of Milan who had previously created a number of similar Ferrari and Alfa Romeo models. Customer sales soon started, with 166 Inter models becoming the first Ferraris to be purchased for the road rather than the race track. As was typical at the time, a bare chassis was delivered to the coachbuilder of the customer's choice. Majority used Touring with coupé or barchetta style. Carrozzeria Ghia produced one-off coupé designed by Felice Mario Boano. Others were built by Stabilimenti Farina, who penned coupés and cabriolets. Bertone bodied one cabriolet. Vignale also joined in with seven bodyworks, presaging their designs of the coming decade, foreshadowed those companies' later involvement with Ferrari.

References

Bibliography

External links

 Ferrari 166 Inter: Ferrari History

166 Inter
Sports cars
Cars introduced in 1948